is a railway station on the IR Ishikawa Railway Line in the city of Kanazawa, Ishikawa, Japan, operated by the third sector railway operator IR Ishikawa Railway.

Lines
Through trains to and from the Ainokaze Toyama Railway Line and JR West Nanao Line also operate over this line.

Layout
The station consists of an island platform serving two tracks, with and elevated station building located above the platform, with entrances on the east and west sides.

Platforms

Adjacent stations

History
The station opened on 1 August 1933. With the privatization of JNR on 1 April 1987, the station came under the control of JR West. From this date, Higashi-Kanazawa Station was transferred to the ownership of the third-sector operating company IR Ishikawa Railway.

Surrounding area

Passenger statistics
In fiscal 2015, the station was used by an average of 2,849 passengers daily (boarding passengers only).

See also
 List of railway stations in Japan

References

External links

 IR Ishikawa Railway station information 

Railway stations in Ishikawa Prefecture
Railway stations in Japan opened in 1933
IR Ishikawa Railway Line